Spring Valley High School is a high school located in an unincorporated portion of Wayne County, West Virginia, United States, with a postal address in the nearby city of Huntington. It is part of the Wayne County Board of Education system.

Mission statement
The school's mission statement is:

Clubs
The school has several clubs, including:
National Honor Society
HATS
Interact Club
4H Club
Spanish Honors Club
FEA (know known as Educators Rising)
JROTC
SVHS Marching Band
SVHS Show Choir
Timberwolf Actors Guild: International Thespian Society
TGIM
SOAR - Science Club
Esports
Lego Club
Chess Club
Speech and Debate Club

Athletics 
Football
Men's and Women's Soccer
Wrestling
Golf
Swimming
Cheerleading
Men's and Women's Basketball
Volleyball
Baseball
Softball
Men's and Women's Tennis
Men's and Women's Track
Men's and Women's Cross Country
Dance Team
Bass Team

The Bands
Spring Valley High School originally had a marching band during the summer/fall and concert band during the winter/spring with most members participating in each.  Additionally, a Jazz Band was held as an after-school club.  Including auxiliary members, the band was nearly 200 members.  Over time the school has adjusted the music program, currently with a total of six different bands. The first band is the "Freshman Band", limited to freshmen. The "Symphonic Band"  consists mainly of sophomores and juniors. The "Wind Ensemble" consists of juniors, seniors, and a few sophomores. The award-winning "Jazz Ensemble" was chosen to play at the West Virginia State Music Convention, the highest recognition a West Virginia jazz band can receive. In 2008–09, the program developed a Secondary Jazz Band along with a "Non-Marching Band" class. Students who are not in the marching band are required to enter the new class.

Since the school's inception, the "Marching Timberwolves" have won numerous awards in many competitions including their first time on the competition field in Hurricane, WV during the fall of 1998. In fact, the colorguard went undefeated in 2010, winning first place at every competition including the biggest one held at Marshall University. Composed of approximately 15% of the school's total enrollment, the band's performances include appearances at the Gator Bowl, Sugar Bowl, Walt Disney World, MGM Studios, James Madison "Parade of Champions", and many amusement parks.

References

External links
 Wayne County Board of Education
 Spring Valley High School

Educational institutions established in 1998
Public high schools in West Virginia
Schools in Wayne County, West Virginia
1998 establishments in West Virginia